In mathematics, two real numbers   are called conjugate indices (or Hölder conjugates) if 

  

Conjugate indices are used in Hölder's inequality. If  are conjugate indices, the spaces Lp and Lq are dual to each other (see Lp space).

See also
 Beatty's theorem

References
 Antonevich, A. Linear Functional Equations, Birkhäuser, 1999. .

Functional analysis
Linear functionals